Mark Arthur Cheetham (born 1954) is professor in the department of Art History at the University of Toronto. Cheetham is a specialist in writing about art in modern and contemporary art.

Selected publications
 Theory Between the Disciplines: Authority Vision Politics. Coeditor with Martin Kreiswirth. Ann Arbor: University of Michigan Press, 1990.
 Remembering Postmodernism: Trends in Recent Canadian Art. Oxford and Toronto: Oxford University Press, 1991. Second, revised ed. OUP, 2012.
 The Rhetoric of Purity: Essentialist Theory and the Advent of Abstract Painting. Cambridge: Cambridge University Press (Cambridge New Art History and Criticism series, ed. Norman Bryson), 1991.
 La Mémoire Postmoderne: Essai sur l’art canadien postmoderne. Trans. Jean Papineau. Montréal: Liber, 1992. (This is a French ed. of Remembering Postmodernism, cited below. Recipient of the Prix littéraire du Gouverneur général, catégorie traduction, 1992)
 Alex Colville: The Observer Observed. Toronto: ECW Press, 1994. (2nd ed., 1995).
 The Subjects of Art History: Historical Objects in Contemporary Perspective. Coeditor with Michael Ann Holly and Keith Moxey, Cambridge University Press, 1998. (Korean translation, Seoul: Kyungsung University Press, 2007)
 Kant, Art, and Art History: Moments of Discipline. Cambridge University Press, 2001. Chinese trans., Nanjing: Jiangsu Fine Arts Publishing House, 2010.
 Abstract Art Against Autonomy: Infection, Resistance, and Cure since the '60s. Cambridge University Press, 2006.
 Artwriting, Nation, and Cosmopolitanism in Britain: The "Englishness" of English Art Theory since the 18th Century. Ashgate: British Art: Global Contexts series. Feb. 2012.
 Jack Chambers: Life & Work. Toronto: Art Canada Institute, 2013.
 Landscape into Eco Art: Articulations of Nature since the '60s. Penn State UP, Feb. 2018.

References 

Living people
Canadian art historians
Academic staff of the University of Toronto
Alumni of University College London
1954 births